Doug Sharp (born November 27, 1969, in Marion, Ohio) is an American bobsledder who competed from the late 1990s to the early 2000s. He won the bronze medal in the four-man event at the 2002 Winter Olympics in Salt Lake City.

Prior to his involvement in bobsleigh, Sharp was also involved in track and field in the pole vault, barely missing the cut-off qualification for the United States Olympic trials for the 1996 Summer Olympics in Atlanta. He also played American football and ice hockey. At the time of the 2002 games, he also served as an assistant athletics coach for the University of Louisville in Kentucky.

Sharp also is a licensed chiropractor and serves in the United States Army in artillery. He graduated from Purdue University in 1993.

In 2008, Sharp married Carrie Weil, an Emmy Award-winning journalist and morning news anchor for WAVE TV3 in Louisville at the time. In 2010, the couple decided to head north from Kentucky, and they resided in Bay City, Michigan. Carrie Sharp is currently an evening news anchor for WTVF-TV in Nashville, Tennessee. He also has a niece named Shelby.

References

 Bobsleigh four-man Olympic medalists for 1924, 1932–56, and since 1964
 CNN Sports Illustrated profile of 2002 US bobsled team
 United States Olympic Committee profile
 University of Louisville profile
 

1969 births
American male bobsledders
American chiropractors
American men's ice hockey players
American male pole vaulters
Bobsledders at the 2002 Winter Olympics
Olympic bronze medalists for the United States in bobsleigh
Living people
Purdue Boilermakers men's track and field athletes
Sportspeople from Louisville, Kentucky
United States Army soldiers
Louisville Cardinals track and field coaches
Medalists at the 2002 Winter Olympics
U.S. Army World Class Athlete Program